Printworks is a nightclub and events venue in Rotherhithe, South London. It is located in the former Harmsworth Quays printing plant, which printed newspapers including the Daily Mail and Evening Standard until 2012.
  
Some features of the printing plant have been retained including the van loading dock and metal stairs, creating an industrial feel in the club. The premises has an overall capacity of 6,000 people across two performance rooms: the Press Halls and Inkwells (Formally known as the Darkroom).

The site is also available for hire and has been used for events, movies and commercials.

Artists, music and perception 
The venue opened in 2017 with an event by Seth Troxler, The Martinez Brothers and Loco Dice. It primarily focuses on electronic music, but has also been host to other genres such as orchestral music.

Printworks has been described by Mixmag as "the saviour London clubbing desperately needed" and as "one of the most striking venues the capital city, if not the country, has to offer". The venue was repeatedly voted into the "Top 100 Clubs" list by the readers of DJ Magazine.

The venue follows a template similar to that of The Warehouse Project, where they run events (Around 20) in seasons - for a period of weeks (Around 13), but not throughout the full year. Generally, SS (Spring and Summer) runs from February until April, then AW runs September until December. With occasional special events, such as New Years and Bank Holidays.

Potential Closure and Redevelopment of the Area  
In autumn 2021, the owners of the site, British Land, submitted plans to Southwark Council to redevelop the site into office buildings which would involve the demolition of the Printworks venue. This was widely opposed by the music community as destruction of a key part of London's music scene. In 2022, the plans were approved, meaning SS23  will be the last season for music events in the venue, for a number of years after outcry from the community saved the venue.  

The team opened a new venue in East London, called The Beams, in October 2022.

Awards and nominations

DJ Magazine's top 100 clubs

References

Nightclubs in London
Buildings and structures in the London Borough of Southwark